75th Brigade may refer to:

 75th Field Artillery Brigade (United States)
 75th Indian Infantry Brigade, Indian Army
 75th Brigade (United Kingdom)

See also 
 75th Division (disambiguation)
 75th Regiment (disambiguation)